A Sheffield Blade is a 1918 British silent drama film directed by Joseph Jay Bamberger and Harry T. Roberts and starring George Foley and Jill Willis.

Cast
 George Foley as Billy Baxter 
 Jill Willis as Ruth Roland

References

Bibliography
 Palmer, Scott. British Film Actors' Credits, 1895–1987. McFarland, 1988.

External links

1918 films
1918 drama films
British silent feature films
British drama films
British black-and-white films
1910s English-language films
1910s British films
Silent drama films